Christiane Herzog (née Krauss; (26 October 1936 – 19 June 2000) was the wife of Roman Herzog, the former President of Germany.

Biography
She was the daughter of a Protestant parish priest, Paul Krauss and his wife Friedl. As a child Christiane was probably destined for leadership joining the Pathfinder movement. She was educated at the same school as her future husband, Landshut Grammar, in The Allgau, Bavaria, and studied at University of Munich graduating in Pedagogy, in 1955. She married in 1958, still aged only twenty-one, Roman Herzog, a childhood sweetheart. Christiane and her husband were members of the Evangelical Church in Germany, they had two sons (born 1959 and 1964). Before he was elected President, Roman had a long and distinguished career as a legal scholar and professor at various universities, and since as a Member of Parliament, as a cabinet minister in the state of Baden-Württemberg, as a judge and finally President of the Federal Constitutional Court of Germany from 1987 to 1994. The family lived in a number of cities, moving in 1969 to Ziegelhausen, near Heidelberg. From 1973 the family was living at the West German capital Bonn. Before moving to Stuttgart in 1978 and then finally to Karlsruhe.

From 1985 to 1993, she was the Vice President of the Christliches Jugenddorfwerk Deutschlands. During her husband's tenure as President, she was the patron of the German UNICEF committee and the Müttergenesungswerk, and took on several charitable responsibilities. On her husband's election as President of Germany she is said to have remarked "I do not consider myself a carnation in the button-hole."

During 1990s Christiane appeared in several films. Beckmann (1999) in which she was uncredited for one episode, was a successful series that reached international audiences. On the television show Zu Gast bei Christiane Herzog (1996), where she invited a guest (usually some prominent person) to the Bellevue Palace and discussed contemporary issues in the kitchen of the presidential residence while they were cooking. This theme gained critical acclaim when published into English as An Invitation to Dine. and Kochern mit Kindern.

She was a guest on the Wetten, dass...? (1996) game show for children. And the previous year she had been invited on the talk show Alfredissimo -kochen mit bio. Her beef roulade, goose breast, and spaetzle became favourites with the German public. Known also for her affable, well-meaning charm, she was mimiced by comedians, for her no-nonsense bossy approach. Popular with racing driver, Michael Schumacher, professional chef, Otto Koch, and the entertainer Thomas Gottschalk; she left her critics spellbound by serenity and politeness. She was a relentless perfectionist; characteristic of her nationhood perhaps, she was made "kitchen Woman of the Year, 1998". After 42 years of marriage she cut a traditional figure of frau at work in the kitchen with a strong message and positive attitude. She brushed off accusations that she was anti-feminist, saying "even single people have to eat." Although never credited as an actress, she was a well-known national celebrity in her own right, exploring the part she played in the politics of post-war Germany.

The Christiane Herzog Foundation for the Cystic Fibrosis Sick that became a leading research institute, was named in her honour. Although often attributed to her husband's influence, her own popularity in Germany was considerable. By the time Ramon Herzog took over as president she had driven thousands of kilometres around Germany in her second hand car canvassing the support of at least half a million Germans every year. Christiane's cookbooks became a way to reveal to the Deutsches Volk her husband's diet, giving her cookery a nationwide appeal. As First Lady she visited orphanages in South America, which proved debilitating and exhausting. For the last three years of her life she suffered from an incurable cancer.

References

External links 

 
 Christiane-Herzog-Stiftung
 Christiane Herzog
 Christiane Herzog's Cookery School
 Christiane Herzog (1997)
 President and Mrs Herzog with the Clintons
 Christiane Herzog

1936 births
2000 deaths
Spouses of presidents of Germany
Roman Herzog